Nemophora basella is a moth of the Adelidae family that can be found in Slovakia and Russia.

References

External links
lepiforum.de
Species info at nkis.info

Moths described in 1844
Moths of Europe
Adelidae